Mokwon University is a private university located in Daejeon, South Korea.

External links 
Official site 

Private universities and colleges in South Korea
Universities and colleges in Daejeon